Asoprisnil (INN; developmental code name J-867) is a synthetic, steroidal selective progesterone receptor modulator that was under development by Schering and TAP Pharmaceutical Products for the treatment of uterine fibroids. In 2005, phase III clinical trials were discontinued due to endometrial changes in patients.

See also
 Asoprisnil ecamate
 Mifepristone
 Ulipristal acetate
 Vilaprisan

References

Antiglucocorticoids
Estranes
Experimental drugs
Enones
Aldoximes
Selective progesterone receptor modulators